Hiroaki Suga (born February 21, 1963) is a Japanese biochemist and businessman. He is best known for his work on artificial ribozymes (flexizymes) and their application in mRNA display (RaPID, random nonstandard peptide integrated discovery).

Suga was awarded the 2023 Wolf Prize in Chemistry, jointly with Chuan He and Jeffery W. Kelly, "for pioneering discoveries that illuminate the functions and pathological dysfunctions of RNA and proteins and for creating strategies to harness the capabilities of these biopolymers in new ways to ameliorate human diseases."

Education 

Career

Scientific
After graduating from MIT with a Ph.D., Suga was a postdoctoral researcher at Harvard Medical School before starting his independent career at University at Buffalo. Since 2003 he is a faculty member at the University of Tokyo.

Business
Suga is also a founder of PeptiDream Inc. Tokyo, a publicly traded biopharmaceutical start-up company responsible for discovering and developing non-standard peptide therapeutics in addition to addressing unmet medical needs as well as investigating peptide drug conjugates (PDC), peptides, and small molecule-based drugs. It is traded publicly on the Tokyo First Stock Exchange Market (the market capitalization is over JY 600 billions), which has many partnerships with pharmaceutical companies in worldwide.

Suga is chair of the editorial board at RSC Chemical Biology and associate editor at Angewandte Chemie.

Publications
Suga has published over 250 scientific articles; a small selection is presented here:

Awards
2014 – Akabori Memorial Award (Japanese Peptide Society)
2016 – Max Bergmann Gold Medal (German Peptide Society)
2016 – Nippon Venture Award (METI)
2017 – Nagoya Silver Medal of Organic Chemistry (MSD Life Science Foundation)
2019 – Vincent du Vigneaud Award (American Peptide Society)
2020 – Humboldt Prize (Humboldt Foundation)
2020 – World Entrepreneur of the Year, Japan (EY)
2022 –  (ETH Zurich)
2023 – Wolf Prize in Chemistry (Wolf Foundation)

References

External links

  of Suga Research Group

1963 births
Living people
21st-century Japanese businesspeople
21st-century Japanese chemists
Businesspeople in manufacturing
Businesspeople in the pharmaceutical industry
Japanese chief executives
Japanese company founders
Massachusetts Institute of Technology alumni
Okayama University alumni
People from Okayama
University of Tokyo
Wolf Prize in Chemistry laureates